Sappony Church, also known as Sapony Church and Sappony Episcopal Church, is a historic Episcopal church located at McKenney, Dinwiddie County, Virginia. It was built in 1725–1726, and is a one-story, three bay long, rectangular frame building with a low gable roof. A vestry room was added early in the 19th century; the building was remodeled in the mid-19th century and again in 1870.

It was listed on the National Register of Historic Places in 1976.

References

Churches on the National Register of Historic Places in Virginia
National Register of Historic Places in Dinwiddie County, Virginia
Churches completed in 1726
Episcopal churches in Virginia
Buildings and structures in Dinwiddie County, Virginia
1726 establishments in Virginia
18th-century Episcopal church buildings